Bullhead City School District 15  is a public school district based in Mohave County, Arizona. The superintendent of the Bullhead City School District #15 is Dr. Carolyn Stewart

Schools
Preschool and special needs:
 Coyote Canyon School

PreK/K-4 schools:
 Desert Valley School
 Diamondback Elementary School
 Sunrise Elementary School

5-6 schools:
 Bullhead City Middle School

7-8 schools:
 Fox Creek Junior High School

References

External links
  - The website for Bullhead City School District #15

School districts in Mohave County, Arizona